Miyagi may refer to:

Places
 Miyagi Prefecture, one of the 47 major divisions of Japan
 Miyagi, Gunma, a village in Japan, merged into Maebashi in 2004
Miyagi District, Miyagi, a district in Miyagi Prefecture, Japan

Other uses
 Miyagi (surname)